is an area within the city of Zentsūji, Kagawa Prefecture.
 was a town located within Nakatado District, Kagawa Prefecture. This article only contains the data until the day before the formation of the city of Zentsuji (March 31, 1954).

 was a town located in Nakatado District, Kagawa Prefecture.

History 
November 3, 1901 - The villages of Zentsūji, Yoshida, and Amino merged to become the town of Zentsūji.

Dissolved municipalities of Kagawa Prefecture